The Jordan Baja is an international baja-style rally raid cross-country endurance racing event held in the Wadi Rum desert, in Jordan. The event had the status of a World Cup Baja round in 2021 for both FIA and FIM championships. Jordan Baja had 559 competitive kilometres in a total route of 859 km for 2021 with 15 motorcycles and five quads in fray in the near-by deserts of Wadi Rum. Competitors from 15 nations took part in the fourth round of the FIA World Cup for Cross-Country Bajas, Round 2 of the FIM Bajas World Cup and a National Baja was also held along with the two international-status events.

History 

The event was organized for the first time in 2018, becoming an official event of the FIA World Cup for Cross-Country Bajas in 2019.
After its cancellation in 2020 due to the COVID-19 pandemic, the rally returned to the FIA calendar in 2021.

Winners

Auto

Moto & Quad

External links
Official website

References

Motorsport in Jordan
Recurring sporting events established in 2018
Rally raid races
Cross Country Rally World Cup races